The Institut d'émission d'outre-mer (IEOM) issues the CFP franc, the currency of the French overseas collectivities French Polynesia, New Caledonia, and Wallis and Futuna.

It is headquartered in the 1st arrondissement of Paris.

References

External links
 
IEOM Duties and Activities 

Central banks
Organizations based in Paris